Scientific Australian may refer to:

 Scientific Australian (1895)
 Scientific Australian (1963)
 Scientific Australian (1977)